Tiberius Claudius may refer to:

Tiberius Claudius Cogidubnus, 1st-century king of the Regnenses in early Roman Britain
Tiberius Claudius Narcissus, one of the freedmen who formed the core of the imperial court under the Roman emperor Claudius

See also
Tiberius Claudius Nero (disambiguation)